The Cordillera Talamanca salamander (Bolitoglossa sooyorum) is a species of salamander in the family Plethodontidae.
It is found in Costa Rica and possibly Panama.
Its natural habitat is subtropical or tropical moist montane forests.
It is threatened by habitat loss.

References

Bolitoglossa
Endemic fauna of Costa Rica
Taxonomy articles created by Polbot
Amphibians described in 1953
Talamancan montane forests